Greenbrier, Indiana may refer to:

Greenbrier, Orange County, Indiana
Greenbrier, Warrick County, Indiana